Clivina lata is a species of ground beetle in the family Carabidae, found in Indomalaya. The species Clivina khasi is now considered to be a taxonomic synonym of Clivina lata.

References

Further reading

 

Clivina
Beetles described in 1867